The following is a list of some of the mountains of Southeast Asia.

List of highest mountains

See also
List of highest mountains
List of highest mountains of New Guinea
List of islands by highest point
List of ribus (summits in Indonesia with 1000 m topographic prominence)
Seven Summits

References

Mountains